Tenth Street Promenade is a Metromover station in the Brickell district of Downtown, Miami, Florida.

This station located on Southwest First Avenue (SE First Ave on Google Maps and street signs say Brickell Plaza) and 10th Street, opening to service May 26, 1994. It serves Mary Brickell Village, Brickell City Centre, Premiere Towers, 1101 Brickell Building, and 1010 Brickell.

Station layout

External links
 MDT – Metromover Stations
 10th Street entrance from Google Maps Street View

Brickell Loop
Metromover stations
Railway stations in the United States opened in 1994
1994 establishments in Florida